Salvatore Aurelio (born 15 January 1986) is an Italian footballer who plays as a forward for Arenzano.

Club career

Genoa and loans
A youth product of Genoa C.F.C., he played on loan with Carrarese (Serie C2, also in co-ownership deal) and Verona (Serie B).

He joined the first team in the 2006–07 season, but in January left on loan to Lucchese (Serie C1), due to new strikers being signed.

After Genoa won a promotion to Serie A, Aurelio became surplus to the team and was sold to A.C. Cesena in co-ownership deal in late June, for €0.5 million (also part of Papa Waigo's deal).

He then bought back by Genoa for just €1,000 and loaned him to Crotone, as part of Felice Natalino's deal.

Frosinone
In June 2009, Aurelio was sold to Frosinone in co-ownership deal, for €800,000. In the same month Genoa signed Salvatore Bocchetti outright for another €2.3 million.

On 24 June 2010, the club signed him outright along with Diogo Tavares, co-currently, Robert Gucher joined Genoa. At that time half of the registration rights of Aurelio was valued €800,000, while Tavares was valued €600,000 and lastly Gucher for €1.3 million. Moreover, Selim Ben Djemia's loan had cost Fronisone €100,000 and Gucher had cost Geona €200,000, made Genoa nor Fronisone owe more money to opposite side.

In January 2011 he left for Lega Pro Prima Divisione club Salernitana in temporary deal, with Manolo Pestrin moved to opposite direction. He only played 3 Serie B games for Frosinone in the first half of 2010–11 Serie B. In 2011 Frosinone relegated to the same division, as well as the bankruptcy of Salernitana.

Aurelio spent 2 and a half seasons with Fronisone in the third division.

AlbinoLeffe
On 31 January 2014 Aurelio left for fellow Prima Divisione club AlbinoLeffe, with Alessio Viola moved to opposite direction. Fronisone promoted to Serie B while AlbinoLeffe losing the promotion playoffs.

International career
Aurelio was a member of the Italy Under-17 side during the 2003 UEFA European Under-17 Championship first qualifying round. However he was dropped out from the squad in the second qualifying round as well as in the finals.

References

External links

aic.football.it 

Italian footballers
Genoa C.F.C. players
Hellas Verona F.C. players
S.S.D. Lucchese 1905 players
A.C. Cesena players
F.C. Crotone players
Frosinone Calcio players
U.C. AlbinoLeffe players
Serie B players
Serie C players
Italy youth international footballers
Association football forwards
Footballers from Naples
1986 births
Living people